The Philadelphia White Stockings were a professional baseball franchise that was based in Philadelphia, Pennsylvania. There were known alternatively as the Whites, Phillies, Philadelphias, or Pearls, and played their home games at the Jefferson Street Grounds.

List of players
Players in Bold and have the symbol †, are members of the National Baseball Hall of Fame.



A
Bob Addy

B
George Bechtel
Joe Borden

C
Bill Craver
Bill Crowley
Candy Cummings†
Ned Cuthbert

D
Jim Devlin
John Donnelly

E
Dave Eggler

F
Cherokee Fisher
Chick Fulmer

G

H
Nat Hicks
Jim Holdsworth

I

J

K

L

M
Denny Mack
Fergy Malone
Mike McGeary
Ed McKenna
John McMullin
Levi Meyerle
Tim Murnane

N

O

P
Charlie Pabor
Bill Parks

Q
Quinlan

R
John Radcliff
Johnny Ryan

S
Orator Shafer
Pop Snyder

T
Fred Treacey

U

V

W
Sam Weaver
Jimmy Wood

X

Y
Tom York

Z
George Zettlein

References

External links
Franchise index at Baseball-Reference and Retrosheet

Philadelphia White Stockings

Major League Baseball all-time rosters